Gonzalo Pizarro y Alonso (1510 – April 10, 1548) was a Spanish conquistador and younger paternal half-brother of Francisco Pizarro, the conqueror of the Inca Empire. Bastard son of Captain Gonzalo Pizarro y Rodríguez de Aguilar (senior) (1446–1522) who as colonel of infantry served in the Italian campaigns under Gonzalo Fernández de Córdoba, and in Navarre, with some distinction, and María Alonso, from Trujillo. He was the half brother of Francisco and Hernándo Pizarro and the full brother of Juan Pizarro.

Early years in Peru 
Born in Trujillo, Spain, Gonzalo Pizarro accompanied his eldest brother, Francisco Pizarro, in his third expedition for the conquest of Peru in 1530. Gonzalo was also the brother of Hernando Pizarro and Juan Pizarro. A lieutenant of his brother Francisco during the conquest, Gonzalo Pizarro was one of the most corrupt, brutal and ruthless conquistadors of the New World, being far less restrained towards the natives and the Inca than his older brothers.

After Inca emperor Atahualpa was captured in the Battle of Cajamarca and later executed, the Pizarro brothers and their followers marched towards the Inca capital of Cuzco to complete the conquest, capturing the city on 15 November 1533 after a brief battle with the Inca forces under Quizquiz holding it after previously defeating the central government and massacring the nobility of Cuzco. Gonzalo, and his brother Juan, were made regidores of the city on 24 March 1534.

Cusco was split into factions behind Francisco Pizarro and Diego de Almagro, but these two signed a new article of agreement on 12 June 1535. Almagro then left Cuzco, having been given the honor by Spanish King Charles I of exploring the southern part of Peru (modern-day Chile)

Gonzalo and Juan Pizarro both looked after the settlements in Cuzco, while their eldest brother Francisco explored the west coast of northern Peru and founded the city of Lima in 1535. Gonzalo, Juan and his younger brother Hernándo ruled Cuzco as a dictatorship dominated by greed, corruption and brutality; torturing and executing those who refused to accept Spanish rule. Particularly egregious was the conduct of Juan and Gonzalo Pizarro towards the Inca Emperor, Manco Inca Yupanqui.  Manco was angered by the conduct of the Spaniards towards Incan women, especially after Gonzalo raped his queen and sister-wife Cura Ocllo.  The Spaniards corrupt rule and disrespectful treatment towards Manco Inca Yupanqui led to large-scale rebellion.

The Incas fought the Spaniards in a number of sieges and battles for control of the land and temporarily captured Cuzco on May 6, 1536. The Incas were later defeated by the heavily armed Spanish soldiers led by Gonzalo and Juan. Smallpox was also spread among the natives and many perished.

When Almagro returned from Chile disappointed in not finding any gold, he captured and imprisoned Gonzalo and Hernándo on 8 April 1537. Gonzalo managed to escape and re-join Francisco Pizarro, while Almagro was on his way to Lima to negotiate with Francisco on who would control Cuzco. These negotiations led to Hernándo's release.  Hernando and Gonzalo then led an army against Almagro, defeating him in the Battle of Las Salinas.  Almagro was captured, condemned for treason, and executed in Cusco on July 8, 1538.

Expeditions with Francisco de Orellana 
In November 1539, Francisco Pizarro appointed Gonzalo vice-governor of Quito, which had been taken in 1534 by Sebastián de Benalcázar. Gonzalo was ordered to explore east of Quito to investigate the rumors of a rich native kingdom to the east, called El Dorado, and of the so-called Land of Cinnamon - "País de la Canela". Gonzalo set about organising an expedition in Cusco; among those he recruited was Francisco de Orellana, a veteran of the conquest of the Inca and a dependable supporter of the Pizarro brothers. With 170 Spaniards and 3,000 Native Americans, Gonzalo marched to Quito in December 1540 and enlisted a further 220 Spaniards and 4,000 Native Americans. Orellana, Gonzalo's second-in-command and relative, was sent to Guayaquil to gather more troops and horses. Gonzalo Pizarro and his followers left Quito on February 1541, a month before Orellana, who was able to bring 23 men and several horses. By March, the two met at the valley of Zumaco and started their march across the Andes. After following the courses of the Coca and Napo rivers, the expedition started to run out of provisions. About 140 of the 340 Spaniards and 3,000 out of 4,000 natives died. In February 1542, the leaders decided Orellana would take 50 men and continue sailing down the Napo river in search of food, then return to Pizarro. However, the return trip proved impossible because of adverse currents and Orellana's own pursuit of discovery.

After a brief period, Gonzalo concluded the expedition was a complete failure and decided to take a northern route back to Quito with 80 of the remaining men, unknowingly relinquishing the success to Orellana, who ended discovering and exploring the entire length of the Amazon River.

Upon his return to Quito, Gonzalo learned that the Almagristas (as the followers of Almagro were called) had assassinated his brother Francisco Pizarro on June 26, 1541 in retaliation for Almagro's execution. By this time the Crown's representative, Cristóbal Vaca de Castro, had arrived in Peru amidst the confusion after Pizarro's death. Gonzalo offered to help capture those responsible for his brother's death, but was refused. The Almagristas were finally defeated in the battle of Chupas on September 16, 1542, and their leader, Diego Almagro El Mozo, was executed.

Gonzalo turns against the Spanish King 
Emperor Charles V then appointed Blasco Núñez Vela as Peru's first viceroy in 1544. Núñez introduced the New Laws, which were framed by Bartolomé de las Casas to protect the indigenous peoples. Many of the conquistadors living in Peru were against these laws since they could no longer exploit the natives. This prompted Gonzalo Pizarro and Francisco de Carvajal to organize an army of followers with the intent of suppressing the New Laws. Many conquistadors turned against the Viceroy and joined Gonzalo's side, as his surname provided an effective rallying point. The rebel army defeated Núñez in 1546 at Añaquito near Quito. Although some, such as Carvajal, advised Gonzalo to proclaim himself King of Peru and to disown any further claim by the King of Spain to the land, Gonzalo refused.

Over the following months, however, the support for Gonzalo diminished when the King's new representative, Pedro de la Gasca, arrived with the intention of offering pardon and repealing the New Laws. Most of Gonzalo's army deserted him just before the crucial battle of Jaquijahuana near Cusco, that would determine the fate of the conquest. No longer supported with an army against the King's new representative, Gonzalo Pizarro surrendered and was beheaded  by the royal forces on the field of battle, being the last of the Pizarro brothers to die a violent death (with Hernando dying of old age in Spain some three or six decades later).

Ancestors

In popular culture 
Gonzalo Pizarro has been immortalised in several different projects over the years. In 1972 Werner Herzog wrote and directed the film Aguirre, the Wrath of God, a film that featured actor Klaus Kinski and Alejandro Repullés who played Gonzalo. The film reimagines two expeditions led by Gonzalo Pizarro, one in 1541, which resulted in the European discovery of the Amazon river by Francisco de Orellana, and another in which Pizarro and his men went in search of El Dorado. Aguirre, the Wrath of God received widespread critical acclaim and developed a cult following, it has appeared on Time magazine's list of "All Time 100 Best Films".

In 2011 NetEnt, a leading global supplier of online casino software and games released a video slot called Gonzo's Quest for desktop and mobile browsers. A decade later in 2021 Evolution acquired the rights to the Gonzo's Quest IP and released Gonzo's Treasure Hunt Live a live casino game show game also playable on desktop and mobile browsers. Both titles feature a 3D animated version of Gonzalo Pizarro who interacts with the players throughout the duration of gameplay.

References

Further reading 
 Andrew Dalby, "Christopher Columbus, Gonzalo Pizarro, and the search for cinnamon" in Gastronomica (Spring 2001).
 F.A. Kirkpatrick, "The Spanish Conquistadores" Third Reprinting 1968.
 Rafael Varón Gabai, "Francisco Pizarro and his brothers: the illusion of power in sixteenth-century Peru" London 1997.
 Fray Gaspar Carvajal, "Relación del nuevo descubrimiento del famoso río Grande de las Amazonas" (ed. intro. y notas de Jorge Hernández Millares) Mexico 1955.

External links 

 

1502 births
1548 deaths
People from Tierra de Trujillo
16th-century South American people
16th-century Spanish people
Executed Spanish people
Spanish colonization of the Americas
Extremaduran conquistadors
People executed by New Spain
Colonial Peru
People executed by Spain by decapitation